David Wright is a retired American soccer defender who played professionally in the USL A-League.

Wright graduated from Ballard High School.  During his prep soccer career, Wright was a two-time high school state champion and the Kentucky High School Player of the Year.  Wright attended Creighton University, where he was a 1999 NCAA First Team All American.  Wright also played for the Jackson Chargers of the USL Premier Development League during the college off-season.  In February 2000, the Miami Fusion selected Wright in the third round (twenty-fifth overall) of the 2000 MLS SuperDraft.  Wright was the last player released during the pre-season.  However, the Pittsburgh Riverhounds had also drafted Wright in the second round (45th overall) of the 2000 A-League Draft.  After leaving the Fusion, Wright signed with the Riverhounds, playing for them until 2003.  In 2002, Wright injured his knee in the pre-season and saw time in only nine games during the second half of the season.  In January 2004, Wright joined the Rochester Rhinos.

References

Living people
1978 births
American soccer players
Creighton Bluejays men's soccer players
Jackson Chargers players
Miami Fusion draft picks
Pittsburgh Riverhounds SC players
Rochester New York FC players
A-League (1995–2004) players
USL League Two players
Soccer players from Louisville, Kentucky
All-American men's college soccer players
Association football defenders